Gabriel Cuéllar (born 26 September 1942) is a former Mexican cyclist. He competed in the individual road race at the 1968 Summer Olympics.

References

External links
 

1942 births
Living people
Mexican male cyclists
Olympic cyclists of Mexico
Cyclists at the 1968 Summer Olympics
Sportspeople from Hidalgo (state)